The Gandhi Bhawan is a major landmark of the city of Chandigarh, India, and a center dedicated to the study of the words and works of Mohandas K. Gandhi. It was designed by the architect Pierre Jeanneret, a cousin of Le Corbusier.

Design
It is an auditorium hall that sits in the middle of a pond of water. A mural by the architect greets visitors at the entry. The words "Truth is God" are written at the entrance. Today, it also houses a substantial collection of books on Gandhi.

References

Gandhism
Buildings and structures in Chandigarh
Tourist attractions in Chandigarh
Memorials to Mahatma Gandhi
Gandhi museums